Jabeek (Limburgish: Jaobik, English: Yescreek) is a village in the Dutch province of Limburg. It is located in the municipality of Beekdaelen, on the German border about 8 km east of Geleen. Jabeek borders on the German village .

History 
The village was first mentioned in 1144 as "apud Iabeche". The etymology is unclear. Jabeek developed in the Early Middle Ages as a cultivation village.

The Catholic St Gertrudis is a three-aisled basilica-like church with a needle spire. The tower was built in the 15th century. The church was rebuilt between 1858 and 1859 after a design by Joseph Cuypers and the tower was enlarged. The farm Etzenradehuuske was built in 1710 and was part of a castle which was demolished in 1880.

Jabeek was home to 344 people in 1840. Jabeek was a separate municipality until 1982, when it was merged into Onderbanken. In 2019, it became part of the municipality of Beekdaelen.

Gallery

References

External links

Populated places in Limburg (Netherlands)
Former municipalities of Limburg (Netherlands)
Beekdaelen